The Dabur ITO metro station is a station on the Delhi Metro, under the Violet Line. It was inaugurated on 8 June 2015 by the then Urban Development Minister M Venkaiah Naidu and Delhi Chief Minister Arvind Kejriwal.

The ITO metro station was one of the most awaited stations of the Delhi Metro under Phase III expansion. Whereas the opening of the Mandi House metro station, which is also an interchange station now, took a chunk of the load off the Rajiv Chowk metro station. The ITO metro station is expected to take some of the surface traffic off the ITO intersection, which witnesses heavy traffic jams due to a number of private and commercial vehicles, coming from South and East Delhi, which is the main arterial road for the people residing in those areas. According to Delhi Police, the ITO intersection is one of the most congested areas in the city, with the entire flow of traffic from east Delhi to the rest of the city and vice versa. going through this intersection. Over 1.75 lakh vehicles use the ITO intersection every day.

With the opening of the ITO metro station, a number of commuters whose offices are located in the ITO area as expected to switch to the metro. As per estimates of the Delhi Metro, around 25,000 commuters are expected to use the station by 2016. The number will go up to over 35,000 by 2021, said a Delhi Metro official.

History
The ITO metro station is the last station to be opened individually before the entire corridor is commissioned in 2016. Part of the 'Heritage Line', the station is followed by stations – Delhi Gate metro station, Jama Masjid metro station, Lal Qila metro station and Kashmere Gate metro station.

The station was finished in September 2014 and trial runs began in December 2014. However, operations on the 971-metre section between Mandi House and ITO were not started as safety inspection could not be carried out as per provisions of the Metro Railway General Rules. The Urban Development Ministry had amended and notified changes to the Metro Railway General Rules, 2013, to allow operations on single-line sections, which was a major stumbling block in operationalising the line. Originally, scheduled to open in March 2015, it was opened for public use on 8 June 2015.

For now being the new terminus of the Violet Line, going uptill Faridabad, the metro station will connect ITO to South Delhi, East Delhi and the satellite city of Faridabad. It will also provide easy connectivity to thousands coming from rest of the city through interchange stations on the Violet Line. From ITO, commuters can access the Blue Line (Dwarka Sector 21 to Noida City Centre/Vaishali) as well as the Yellow Line (HUDA City Centre to Badli). In fact, it will also provide accessibility to all the lines of the Delhi Metro network through the various interchange stations on the corridor.

The Station

Station layout

Facilities

Entry/Exit

Nearby locations

Apart from the Income Tax Office and the Delhi Police Headquarters, the area is home to scores of administrative buildings, offices of prominent media houses and a range of other locations that commuters at ITO station reach every day.

Media establishments : Business Standard, Economic Times, Times of India, ThePrint, The Hindu, BusinessWorld, The Pioneer (India), MBD Publications, Veer Arjun, Indian Express advertisement offices
Leisure : Bal Bhawan, Shankar's International Dolls Museum
Arts and Culture : Hindi Bhawan, Gandharva Mahavidyalaya, Pearey Lal Bhawan auditorium, Children's Book Trust
Government offices : Comptroller and Auditor General of India, University Grants Commission (India), 
Bureau of Indian Standards, Delhi Development Authority, Quality Council of India

Offices of other national bodies : Indian National Science Academy, Institute of Chartered Accountants of India Indian Institute of Public Administration, School of Planning and Architecture, Delhi
Offices of Political organizations : Centre of Indian Trade Unions
Hospital : Maulana Azad Medical College
Historical monument : Feroz Shah Kotla

Connections

Bus
Delhi Transport Corporation bus routes number 26, 135, 173, 274, 402CL, 403, 403CL, 404, 405, 405A, 405STL, 411, 419, 419LSTL, 423, 425CL, 429, 429CL, 447, 501, 502, 503, 621, 632, 722, 790, GL-22 serves the station from Lala R.C. Agarwal Chowk stop.

Delhi Transport Corporation bus routes number 73, 85, 85EXT, 85Ext, 135, 281, 310, 313, 317, 335, 336A, 340, 349, 349A, 375, 378, 390, 391, 418A, 418EXT, 623, 623A, 623B, 623EXT, 624ACL, 624BLnkSTL, 720, 723, 740, 740A, 740B, 740EXT, 770A, 910, 943, GL-22 serves the station from ITO bus stop.

Rail
 of Indian Railways situated nearby.

See also

Delhi
List of Delhi Metro stations
Transport in Delhi
Delhi Metro Rail Corporation
Delhi Suburban Railway
Delhi Monorail
Delhi Transport Corporation
Central Delhi
National Capital Region (India)
List of rapid transit systems
List of metro systems

References

External links

 Delhi Metro Rail Corporation Ltd. (Official site) 
 Delhi Metro Annual Reports
 
 UrbanRail.Net – descriptions of all metro systems in the world, each with a schematic map showing all stations.

Delhi Metro stations
Railway stations in India opened in 2015
2015 establishments in Delhi
Railway stations in New Delhi district